The 2016 United States House of Representatives elections in Massachusetts were held on November 8, 2016, electing the nine U.S. representatives from the Commonwealth of Massachusetts, one from each of the state's nine congressional districts. The elections coincided with the 2016 U.S. presidential election, as well as other elections to the House of Representatives, elections to the United States Senate and various state and local elections. The primaries were held on September 20. All incumbents were re-elected to office.

District 1

The 1st congressional district is located in western and central Massachusetts. The largest Massachusetts district in area, it covers about one-third of the state and is more rural than the rest. It has the state's highest point, Mount Greylock. The district includes the cities of Springfield, West Springfield, Pittsfield, Holyoke, and Westfield. The incumbent is Democrat Richard Neal, who has represented the district since 2013 and previously represented the 2nd district from 1989 to 2013. He was re-elected unopposed with 98% of the vote in 2014 and the district has a PVI of D+13.

Democratic primary

General election

Results

District 2

The 2nd congressional district is located in central Massachusetts. It contains the cities of Worcester, which is the second-largest city in New England after Boston, and Northampton in the Pioneer Valley. The incumbent is Democrat Jim McGovern, who has represented the district since 2013 and previously represented the 3rd district from 1997 to 2013. He was re-elected unopposed with 98% of the vote in 2014 and the district has a PVI of D+8.

Democratic primary

General election

Results

District 3

The 3rd congressional district is located in northeastern and central Massachusetts. It contains the Merrimack valley including Lowell, Lawrence and Haverhill. The incumbent is Democrat Niki Tsongas, who has represented the district since 2013 and previously represented the 5th district from 2007 to 2013. She was re-elected with 63% of the vote in 2014 and the district has a PVI of D+6.

Democratic primary

Republican primary

General election

Results

District 4

The 4th congressional district is located mostly in southern Massachusetts. It contains Bristol, Middlesex, Norfolk, Plymouth and Worcester counties. The incumbent is Democrat Joseph P. Kennedy III, who has represented the district since 2013. He was elected with 98% of the vote in 2014 and the district has a PVI of D+6.

Democratic primary

Republican primary

General election

Results

District 5

The 5th congressional district is located in eastern Massachusetts. It contains Middlesex, Suffolk and Worcester counties. The incumbent is Democrat Katherine Clark, who has represented the district since 2013. She was elected with 98% of the vote in 2014 and the district has a PVI of D+14.

Democratic primary

General election

Results

District 6

The 6th congressional district is located in northeastern Massachusetts. It contains most of Essex County, including the North Shore and Cape Ann. The incumbent is Democrat Seth Moulton, who has represented the district since 2015. He was re-elected with 55% of the vote in 2014 and the district has a PVI of D+4.

Democratic primary

General election

Results

District 7

The 7th congressional district is located in eastern Massachusetts. It contains the northern three-quarters of the city of Boston, the city of Somerville and parts of the city of Cambridge. The incumbent is Democrat Mike Capuano, who has represented the district since 2013 and previously represented the 8th district from 1999 to 2013. He was re-elected with 98% of the vote in 2014 and the district has a PVI of D+31.

Democratic primary

General election

Results

District 8

The 8th congressional district is located in eastern Massachusetts. It contains the southern quarter of the city of Boston and many of its southern suburbs. The incumbent is Democrat Stephen Lynch, who has represented the district since 2013 and previously represented the 9th district from 2001 to 2013. He was re-elected with 99% of the vote in 2014 and the district has a PVI of D+6.

Democratic primary

Republican primary

General election

Results

District 9

The 9th congressional district is located in eastern Massachusetts, including Cape Cod and the South Coast. It contains all of Barnstable, Dukes and Nantucket counties and parts of Bristol and Plymouth counties. The incumbent is Democrat Bill Keating, who has represented the district since 2013 and previously represented the 10th district from 2011 to 2013. He was re-elected with 55% of the vote in 2014 and the district has a PVI of D+5.

Democratic primary

Republican primary

General election

Results

References

External links
U.S. House elections in Massachusetts, 2016 at Ballotpedia
Campaign contributions at OpenSecrets

Massachusetts
2016
2016 Massachusetts elections